Evangelos "Vangelis" Ziagkos (alternate spellings: Vaggelis, Ziagos) (born March 14, 1976) is a Greek professional basketball coach, currently managing Iraklis of the Greek Basket League.

Playing career
Ziagkos played youth club basketball with Attalos Nea Filadelfeia, and also played in the Greek minor leagues with the same club's men's team.

Coaching career
Ziagkos became the head coach the Greek basketball club AEK Athens, prior to the 2012–13 season. He led AEK to gain a league promotion that season, from the Greek 3rd Division, to the Greek 2nd Division. In the following 2013–14 season, he led AEK to the Greek 2nd Division championship. He was also named the Greek 2nd Division's Coach of the Year that season.

He then worked as the head coach of the Greek clubs Doxa Lefkadas and Panionios.

On November 20, 2018, he was appointed head coach of the Rethymno Cretan Kings.

On July 19, 2020, he has signed with Iraklis of the Greek Basket League.

References

External links
Euroleague.net Coach Profile
FIBA Coach Profile
AsiaBasket.com Coach Profile
AEK Athens Coach Profile

1976 births
Living people
AEK B.C. coaches
APOEL B.C. coaches
Doxa Lefkadas B.C. coaches
Greek basketball coaches
Panionios B.C. coaches
Rethymno B.C. coaches
Sportspeople from Ioannina